Bergholtz is a surname. Notable people with the surname include:

Gerard Bergholtz (born 1939), Dutch footballer and manager
Marcus Bergholtz (born 1989), Swedish footballer
Wilhelm Bergholtz, 18th-century German military officer